Pedro Fernández de Velasco, 2nd Count of Haro (in full) (c. 1425 – 1492) was a Spanish nobleman and military figure of the last stages of the Reconquista.

Fernández de Velasco was born in Burgos, the son of Pedro Fernández de Velasco and of Beatriz Manrique. He became Camarero Mayor of King Henry IV of Castile, and viceroy and governor of Castile. In 1473 Henry IV named him sixth Constable of Castile and made this title hereditary in his family.

He participated in the conquest of Úbeda and Baeza, which both occurred on Saint Andrew's day. He also fought against the Moors in the battles of Gibraltar and Archidona and participated in the conquest of Granada, where he died. He and his wife are buried in the Capilla del Condestable in the Burgos Cathedral.

He married Mencía de Mendoza y Figueroa, with whom he had ten children.
Bernardino Fernández de Velasco, 1st Duke of Frías, married
Blanca de Herrera, señora de Pedraza de la Sierra
Juana of Aragon, illegitimate daughter of Ferdinand II of Aragon.
Íñigo Fernández de Velasco, 2nd Duke of Frías, married María de Tovar, Lady of Berlanga
Catarina de Velasco, married Pedro de Zúñiga, 2nd Count of Miranda
Leonor de Velasco, married Juan Téllez-Girón, 2nd Count of Ureña
María de Velasco, married
Juan Pacheco, 1st Duke of Escalona
Beltrán de la Cueva, 1st Duke of Alburquerque
Isabel Fernandez de Velasco, married Juan Alonso de Guzmán, 3rd Duke of Medina Sidonia

Sources

 

1425 births
1492 deaths
Spanish viceroys
102
Lords of Medina de Pomar
Lords of Briviesca
Lords of Villadiego
Lords of Belorado
Lords of Salas de los Infantes y su Sierra
Pedro
Pedro
15th-century Castilians